Jovan Cokić (Serbian Cyrillic: Јован Цокић; 19 August 1927 – 6 February 2004) was a former Serbian footballer.

References

External sources
 

1927 births
2004 deaths
Red Star Belgrade footballers
Yugoslav First League players
Association football midfielders
Yugoslav footballers
Yugoslavia international footballers
OFK Beograd players